Glikeriya Nikolaevna Fedotova (Pozdnyakova, Позднякова, 22 May 1846, Oryol, Russian Empire – 27 February 1925, Moscow, USSR) was a Russian actress associated with Moscow's Maly Theatre, honoured with the titles Meritorious Artist of the Imperial Theatres, People's Artist of the Republic (1924) and Hero of Labour (1924). She was also a personal friend and teacher of Konstantin Stanislavski.

Of the 29 parts Fedotova had in Alexander Ostrovsky's plays, at least two (Snegurochka, Vasilissa Melentyevna) have been written specifically for her by the author. The part of Katerina in The Storm was hers for 35 years, from 1863 onwards. In 1880s Stanislavski invited Fedotova to teach drama at the Art and Literature Society; the most famous of her students there was Alexandra Yablochkina.

She was married to actor, and theater director Aleksandr Fedotov.

References

1846 births
1925 deaths
People from Oryol
Russian actresses
Russian stage actresses